Alain Lemieux (born May 24, 1961) is a Canadian former professional ice hockey player. He played in the National Hockey League (NHL) with the St. Louis Blues, Quebec Nordiques, and Pittsburgh Penguins. He is also the older brother of NHL great Mario Lemieux.

Career
As a youth, Lemieux played in the 1972 Quebec International Pee-Wee Hockey Tournament with a minor ice hockey team from Saint-Jean-de-Matha, Quebec, and in the same 1973 and 1974 tournaments with a team from Ville-Émard, Quebec.

In 1986 he played in Switzerland for EHC Olten. He also played most of the 1986–87 season with the Baltimore Skipjacks of the American Hockey League (AHL), then was promoted to the NHL's Pittsburgh Penguins for the rest of the season, where he played a single game, on February 17, 1987 against the Calgary Flames. He then returned to the Skipjacks for the first half of the 1987–88 season and then finished the season with the Hershey Bears. While in Baltimore, he recorded 88 games, 43 goals, 70 assists, 113 points, and 66 total penalty minutes. In 1994, Lemieux played 12 roller hockey games in Roller Hockey International with the Pittsburgh Phantoms, during the franchise's only season.

Post-playing career
Lemieux was previously a member of the Pittsburgh Ice Arena LP group. In August 2012, the group purchased Valley Sports Complex, an ice rink located in New Kensington, Pennsylvania. 

In April of 2019, Lemieux was named the executive hockey director for the Admirals Hockey Club in Glen Ellyn, Illinois.

In 2021, Lemieux settled in Durango, Colorado and become director of the Durango Area Youth Hockey Association's Durango Ice Devils.

Career statistics

References

External links
 
 Pittsburgh Hockey Net

1961 births
Albany Choppers players
Baltimore Skipjacks players
Canadian ice hockey centres
Chicoutimi Saguenéens (QMJHL) players
ECHL coaches
EHC Olten players
Fredericton Express players
French Quebecers
Hershey Bears players
Ice hockey people from Montreal
Indianapolis Ice players
Living people
Milwaukee Admirals (IHL) players
Montana Magic players
Montreal Juniors players
Oulun Kärpät players
Peoria Rivermen (IHL) players
Pittsburgh Penguins players
Pittsburgh Phantoms (RHI) players
Quebec Nordiques players
St. Louis Blues draft picks
St. Louis Blues players
SaiPa players
Salt Lake Golden Eagles (CHL) players
Springfield Indians players
Trois-Rivières Draveurs players
Tucson Gila Monsters players
Canadian expatriate ice hockey players in Finland
Canadian expatriate ice hockey players in Switzerland
Canadian expatriate ice hockey players in the United States
Canadian ice hockey coaches